Rajnish K. "Raj" Sherman (born 1965) is a Canadian politician from Alberta and former Liberal Member of the Legislative Assembly of Alberta for Edmonton-Meadowlark; which he formerly represented as a Progressive Conservative.
Sherman was elected leader of the Liberal Party on September 10, 2011, and led the party through the 2012 provincial election. He announced his immediate resignation on January 26, 2015, and that he will not be running for a third term as MLA in the next provincial election.

Early life
Sherman was born in 1965 in India but grew up in Squamish, British Columbia after moving there in 1975. As a youngster, he delivered newspapers for The Vancouver Sun and The Province. The third of four sons, Sherman moved to Canada from India at a young age. He moved to Edmonton in the early 1980s to attend the University of Alberta. He graduated from faculty of medicine in 1990, specializing in family and emergency medicine. In addition to being a doctor, Sherman was also a clinical lecturer at the University of Alberta and president of the Emergency Physicians of Alberta within the Alberta Medical Association.

Political career
Sherman first sought public office in the March 2008 provincial election in the constituency of Edmonton-Meadowlark. The seat was left vacant after incumbent Liberal MLA Maurice Tougas retired. Sherman, running as a Progressive Conservative candidate, won the riding comfortably, receiving 2,752 votes over his closest rival, Liberal Debbie Cavaliere. After his election, he was named parliamentary assistant to the Minister of Health and Wellness, Ron Liepert. He also served as a member of the Standing Committee on Health and the Standing Committee on Privileges and Elections, Standing Orders and Printing. He works as an emergency department doctor on Sundays.

In November 2010, Sherman criticized the government for emergency department wait times in Alberta. He was suspended from the Progressive Conservative caucus and sat as an independent MLA. The following spring, he announced his intention to seek the Alberta Liberal Party leadership. At the 2011 leadership convention, he was elected on the first ballot.

In the 2012 Alberta election, Sherman was successful in retaining his seat of Edmonton-Meadowlark with 35.5% of the vote, this time as a member of the Liberal Party. He defeated PC candidate Bob Maskell by 118 votes (0.8%). In the election, the Liberals fell from Official Opposition to third party status behind the PCs and Wildrose. Despite losing almost 17% of the popular vote in a very hotly contested election, the vote was concentrated in enough ridings to retain 5 of their previous MLA's and keep ahead of the NDP. The Liberals lost Edmonton-Riverview, Edmonton-Gold Bar and Calgary-Varsity to the Progressive Conservatives due to tactical voting and the retirement of the incumbent MLAs.

Sherman announced his immediate resignation as Liberal leader on January 26, 2015, citing personal reasons and also announced that he will not run for re-election as an MLA but would remain in the legislature until the next election. Sherman was under investigation by Elections Alberta after allegations he breached political contribution limits by donating more than $15,000 to the party and resigned prior to the results of the investigation being released.

In 2022, he attempted to enter the United Conservative Party leadership election. He requested an exemption to run in the race for not being a party member for 6 months, however it was rejected by the UCP Leadership Election Committee.

In February 2023, he won the UCP nomination in Edmonton Whitemud against Varun Chandrasekar

Personal life
Sherman has coached soccer and basketball, served as the director for the Society of Helping Lives in Poverty, and is a past member of the McKernan housing community. He received a gold pin for his service with STARS and a bronze medal from the Alberta Northwest Lifesaving Society. In his spare time, Sherman enjoys sports, travel and the arts.

While in medical school, Sherman married at the age of 21 and had two children. The marriage ended several years later in part, Sherman says, because as a young doctor he "was never home."

Election results

References

Progressive Conservative Association of Alberta MLAs
Living people
Anglo-Indian people
Canadian Hindus
Independent Alberta MLAs
Politicians from Edmonton
Alberta Liberal Party MLAs
1965 births
21st-century Canadian politicians
Canadian politicians of Indian descent
Canadian people of Anglo-Indian descent